Better Luck Tomorrow is a 2002 American crime-drama film directed by Justin Lin. The film is about Asian American overachievers who become bored with their lives and enter a world of petty crime and material excess. Better Luck Tomorrow introduced film audiences to a cast including Parry Shen, Jason Tobin, Sung Kang, Roger Fan, and John Cho. The film was based loosely on the murder of Stuart Tay, a teenager from Orange County, California, by four Sunny Hills High School honor students on December 31, 1992.

After meeting at the National Association of Broadcasters convention in Las Vegas, Nevada, in April 2001, MC Hammer (credited as a producer) provided the much needed funding to the filmmaker Justin Lin for this film. The director said, "Out of desperation, I called up MC Hammer because he had read the script and liked it. Two hours later, he wired the money we needed into a bank account and saved us."

In its first ever film acquisition, MTV Films eventually acquired Better Luck Tomorrow after it debuted at the 2002 Sundance Film Festival, then MTV Films teamed with Paramount Pictures to release the film theatrically in the United States on April 11, 2003.

Plot 
Ben Manibag is a stereotypical overachieving Asian American in a wealthy Orange County suburb whose goals are to make his high school basketball team, get with his cheerleader crush Stephanie and to get into a prestigious Ivy League university. His perfectionism masks another side of his life, which is toilet-papering houses with his best friend Virgil and engaging in petty crime with Virgil's cousin Han Lue.

Though Ben makes the basketball team, he ends up being mostly a benchwarmer. Through Daric Loo, senior valedictorian and president of nearly every student club, Ben gets involved in a school-wide cheat sheet operation. Daric pays Jesus, another student, to steal the tests from the school office, and Ben uses the tests to make cheat sheets which are then sold off to students. Ben brings Virgil and Han into the scam, and the four of them make a small fortune. Meanwhile, Ben finds himself competing with Steve Choe, a private school student and Stephanie's boyfriend, for Stephanie's affections. Steve discovers Ben's crush and offers to let him take Stephanie to the Winter Formal.

The group's activities gradually escalate into more dangerous scams, such as the theft of computer parts from the school and selling drugs. They become users themselves, with Ben developing a heavy cocaine habit. Feeling increasingly conflicted by the expectations others have of him, and horrified at waking up with a nosebleed due to his cocaine use, Ben decides to quit the group. He resumes his academic pursuits and begins spending more time with Stephanie. He eventually asks her to the formal; she accepts.

After the Winter Formal dance, Ben is lured back to his life of crime when Steve meets with Ben and tells him he has information on a possible score. The group is stunned when Steve reveals he wants them to rob his parents' house. Though Ben and Han are initially against it, Daric convinces the group this would be the perfect opportunity to teach the haughty Steve a lesson.

On New Year's Eve, the four meet Steve at Jesus's house under the pretense of robbing Steve's parents, but Daric, Virgil and Han begin attacking Steve while Ben keeps watch outside. In the ensuing struggle Steve gets Virgil's gun which goes off. Ben runs in and, seeing the gun in Steve's hand, beats Steve with a baseball bat. The group convinces Jesus to bury the body in his backyard for $300. Steve begins to twitch, revealing he's still alive, but Daric suffocates Steve with a gasoline-soaked rag while a tearful Virgil holds his arms back. Afterwards, the four go to a New Year's Eve party, where Ben and Stephanie kiss at midnight.

The next day, while cleaning up the aftermath of the murder, Ben and Virgil hear Steve's phone ringing under the ground in Jesus's backyard. They dig it up and learn it was a call from Stephanie. Ben debates on whether to report Steve's murder to the police. The guilt over Steve's murder is too much for Virgil, who attempts suicide, but fails and suffers potential brain damage. Daric expresses concern about Han or Virgil reporting the murder, but Ben simply resolves to do nothing and walks away.

At the end of the film, Ben is shown alone. He encounters Stephanie one day on the way home. She asks him whether he has seen Steve lately, and expresses some concern that he has not called. They kiss, implying the resumption of their relationship. Ben's voice-over tells the audience that he has no idea about what the future holds, but all he knows is that there is no turning back.

Cast 
 Parry Shen as Ben Manibag, a straight-A student who commits petty crimes to express himself in other ways
 Jason Tobin as Virgil Hu, Ben's friend since the fourth grade
 Sung Kang as Han Lue, Virgil's cousin
 Roger Fan as Daric Loo, the violent, self-centered, senior class valedictorian
 John Cho as Steve Choe, Stephanie's boyfriend
 Karin Anna Cheung as Stephanie Vandergosh
 Jerry Mathers as The Biology Teacher

Development 
Justin Lin said that the title "Better Luck Tomorrow" refers to how the film explores "the whole youth culture of today, specifically Asian-American, but also just the general mentality of teenagers today. I mean, I work with teenagers, I grew up in the 80s, and already it's very different, the mentality. You go to suburbia, you look at upper-middle-class-kids, and through the media they've literally adopted an urban-gangsta-mentality."

While writing the script, he found inspiration in his work as a youth basketball coach and teaching high school students how to make community documentaries.

Originally the film was going to be shot in digital-video, but within two weeks, after Fujifilm and later Kodak proposed deals with the director, the filming switched to 35 mm.

Sung Kang had originally wanted to play Ben Manibag.

Lin's original investors had wanted the entire cast to be Caucasian. Lin objected and continued to fund the project with his credit cards. He said knowing the film "potentially could’ve been the last film I ever made" he wanted to make it "about issues that were very important to me.”

After those funds were depleted, finishing funds equivalent to one third of the film’s budget were provided by Cherry Sky Films for post-production, preparing the film to submit to Sundance, after producer Joan Huang reconnected with Lin at the LA Asian Pacific American Film Festival. Lin also brought in an additional $10,000 from artist MC Hammer, whom he had met while working at the Japanese American National Museum.

Connection to the Fast & Furious franchise 
Director Justin Lin later directed multiple films in the Fast & Furious franchise, with Kang reprising his role as Han Lue. Better Luck Tomorrow was subsequently recognized as Han's origin story, retroactively connecting the film to the Fast & Furious franchise.

Reception

Critical reception  
The film was rated "certified fresh" with an approval rating of 81% by the review aggregation website Rotten Tomatoes, based on 106 reviews with an average rating of 7.03/10. The website's critical consensus reads, "A promising work by Lin, the energetic Better Luck Tomorrow is disturbing and thought-provoking." On Metacritic, the film has a weighted average score of 67 out of 100, based on 32 critics, indicating "generally favorable reviews".

Peter Travers of Rolling Stone wrote "Lin is a talent to watch. There's a sting to this film that gets to you." Roger Ebert in the Chicago Sun-Times gave the film a full four-star-rating and wrote that it was a "disturbing and skillfully-told parable about growing up in today's America" and that Lin "reveals himself as a skilled and sure director." In 2018, Jane Yong Kim of The Atlantic wrote the film "[complicates] the question of Asian American representation in Hollywood in ways that still resonate deeply today."

Release 
Better Luck Tomorrow opened on 13 screens on April 11, 2003, earning the highest per-screen average of any in film release at the time.

Much of the film’s success was attributed to grassroots campaigning by young Asian-American viewers, particularly of university age, who promoted the film on school campuses and online.

Awards and film festivals 
 Official Selection and Grand Jury Prize Nomination – Sundance Film Festival, 2002. In a question and answer session following a festival screening, in response to an audience member who asked director Lin if he thought it was irresponsible to portray Asian-Americans in such a negative light, Roger Ebert stood up and said, angrily, "What I find very offensive and condescending about your statement is nobody would say to a bunch of white filmmakers, 'How could you do this to your people?'". And then he continued: "This film has the right to be about these people, and Asian-Americans have the right to be whatever the hell they want to be. They do not have to 'represent' their people." Ebert's approval of the film drew the attention of major studios, leading eventually to MTV's buying the film for distribution.
 Official Selection – Toronto International Film Festival, 2002. Lin said reception at the Toronto festival was notably different than Sundance with the audience more interested in discussing the state of youth rather than the race of the ethnicity of the actors. “In America, most of the time, I can’t even get into talking about the issues, because they’re just stuck on race," he said.
 Independent Spirit Awards – John Cassavetes Award Nomination, 2004

See also 

 Model minority

References

Further reading

External links 
 
 
 
 

2002 films
2002 crime drama films
2000s teen drama films
American coming-of-age drama films
American crime drama films
American teen drama films
Asian-American drama films
Films about Chinese Americans
Films about Taiwanese Americans
2000s English-language films
Films directed by Justin Lin
Films set in Orange County, California
Films shot in Los Angeles
MTV Films films
Paramount Pictures films
Fast & Furious
Teen crime films
2000s American films
2002 independent films
American independent films